Ronald Thomson may refer to:

Sir Ronald Thomson, Lord Lieutenant of Peeblesshire
Ron Thomson (1929–2004), Scottish journalist
Ronald Ferguson Thomson (1830–1888), British diplomat

See also
Ronald Thompson (disambiguation)